The 1997-1998 season was FK Sarajevo's 49th season in history, and their 4th consecutive season in the top flight of Bosnian football.

Players

Squad

(Captain)
(C)

Statistics

Kit

Competitions

Premier League

Regular season

Play-offs

Group Mostar

Final

References

FK Sarajevo seasons
Sarajevo